Kevin S. Smardz (born December 12, 1975) is an American Republican politician. In 2010, he was elected to an open seat in the New York State Assembly for the 146th district in southern Erie County, New York, which includes Blasdell, Boston, Brant, Collins, Concord, Eden, Evans, Hamburg, Holland, Lackawanna, North Collins, and Sardinia.

Smardz earned a degree in Communications and Broadcasting from Buffalo State College. Upon graduating, he worked in Western New York for various television stations and video production companies. For the past decade, he has served as the Media Director for the Southtowns Christian Center in Hamburg, New York. In 2007, Smardz was elected as a Town Councilman on the Hamburg Town Board and served until he was elected to the State Assembly. He is currently a member of the Hamburg Industrial Development Agency.

References

External links
New York State Assembly website

1975 births
Living people
Republican Party members of the New York State Assembly
New York (state) city council members
Buffalo State College alumni
Politicians from Buffalo, New York
Journalists from New York (state)
People from Hamburg, New York
21st-century American politicians